Sheridan Circle is a traffic circle in the Washington, D.C. neighborhood of Embassy Row. 

A number of embassies ring Sheridan Circle, including the former Turkish chancery, and the Romanian embassy on the southern side, and the Embassy of Pakistan to the northwest.

Dupont Circle is visible down Massachusetts Avenue; in the other direction, the avenue rises toward a bridge over Rock Creek Park.

History
In 1888, the traffic circle was named for General Philip Sheridan, Union general of the American Civil War and later general of the United States Army.

Sheridan Monument

A statue to honor General Sheridan was originally proposed to stand on the north side of Pennsylvania Avenue NW near 13th Street NW,  at what is now Freedom Plaza. Gen. Sheridan's widow advocated to erect the statue at Sheridan Circle instead, with which the statue commission agreed. John Quincy Adams Ward was selected to sculpt the statue. Mrs. Sheridan rejected his original model, saying it was not a good likeness of Gen. Sheridan, and the statue commission rejected Ward's model. The commission and Mrs. Sheridan both approved of a model created by Gutzon Borglum. The statue was dedicated on November 27, 1908.

Letelier Monument

On September 21, 1976, Orlando Letelier and Ronni Karpen Moffitt were killed by a car bomb in the circle. Letelier had been foreign minister in the ousted Allende government of Chile. The bombing was blamed on Chilean DINA agents. Michael Townley, a DINA U.S. expatriate among those convicted for the crime, confessed that he had hired five anti-Castro Cuban exiles to booby-trap Letelier's car. According to Jean-Guy Allard, after consultations with the Coordination of United Revolutionary Organizations leadership (including Luis Posada Carriles and Orlando Bosch), those selected to carry out the murder were Cuban-Americans José Dionisio Suárez, Virgilio Paz Romero, Alvin Ross Díaz and brothers Guillermo and Ignacio Novo Sampoll. According to the Miami Herald, Luis Posada Carriles was at the meeting that decided on Letelier's death and also about the Cubana bombing two weeks later. 

Letelier and Moffitt are commemorated with a small plaque embedded in the grass along the curb where they died, near the Irish and Romanian embassies.

Clashes

On May 16, 2017, dozens of PKK supporters and Kurdish separatists clashed with Turkish security officials at Sheridan Circle. Turkish President Recep Tayyip Erdoğan, visiting the Ambassador's residence that sits on Sheridan Circle, watched the clashes from a distance.

See also
List of circles in Washington, D.C.

References

External links

Sheridan-Kalorama ANC
Ghost Dog Has Three Stories From Sheridan Circle - three historical stories about Sheridan Circle

Squares, plazas, and circles in Washington, D.C.
Streets in Washington, D.C.
Embassy Row